John Adel Elya (16 September 1928 – 19 July 2019) was a bishop of the Melkite Greek Catholic Church. From 1993 to 2004, he served as Eparch of Newton, with jurisdiction over Melkite churches in the United States.

Biography
Elya, a native of Maghdouché, Lebanon, entered the Melkite Basilian Salvatorian Order, where he professed his solemn vows in 1949. After completing his philosophical and theological studies, Elya was ordained a priest on 17 February 1952. He later obtained a licentiate in theology from the Pontifical Gregorian University and taught moral theology and philosophy in the Monastery of Saint Savior in Lebanon and served as rector of the seminary of Saint Basil in Methuen, Massachusetts.

Elya went on to serve as a parish priest in Zerka, Jordan. He also served as the pastor of churches in Manchester, New Hampshire, Toronto, Ontario, and Lawrence, Massachusetts, and as rector of the Annunciation Melkite Catholic Cathedral in Roslindale, Massachusetts. While a priest in the United States he earned a master's degree from Boston College.

In 1977 Elya was named an archimandrite. He was appointed titular Bishop of Abilene of Lysanias and auxiliary to the Eparch of Newton. On 25 November 1993 he was appointed Eparch of Newton, succeeding the deceased Bishop Ignatius Ghattas. Elya was installed 25 January 1994, serving as eparch until his retirement on 22 June 2004. He was succeeded as eparch by Archbishop Cyril Salim Bustros.

In 1996, Bishop Elya took the notable action of ordaining a married man to the priesthood. The Vatican had taken a restrictive view of ordaining married men to the priesthood in the Eastern Catholic churches of North America. Previously, North American married Melkites had gone overseas for ordination and returned as parish priests. Elya was the first to ordain a married man in the United States. In 2011 the Melkite Eparchy formally announced it was not observing the Vatican restriction of married men in the priesthood and in 2014, Pope Francis ended the prohibition.

Distinctions
 Grand Prior of the Province of the United States of the Patriarchal Order of the Holy Cross of Jerusalem

See also
 

Gregory III Laham, current Patriarch
Joseph Tawil, former eparch
Melkite Christianity in Lebanon
 Catholic Church hierarchy
 Catholic Church in the United States
 Historical list of the Catholic bishops of the United States
 List of Catholic bishops of the United States
 Lists of patriarchs, archbishops, and bishops

References

External links
Melkite Greek Catholic Eparchy of Newton Official Website
Melkite Greek Catholic Patriarchate of Antioch, Alexandria and Jerusalem
L'Église Melkite/The Melkite Church.
Melkite Catholic Web Ring.
Extensive history of the Melkite Church
Melkite Ambassadors Young Adult Website
 catholic-hierarchy.org

Episcopal succession

American Melkite Greek Catholic bishops
Lebanese emigrants to the United States
People from Sidon District
1928 births
2019 deaths
Lebanese clergy
American Eastern Catholics
Lebanese Melkite Greek Catholics
Melkite Greek Catholic bishops
Members of the Patriarchal Order of the Holy Cross of Jerusalem